The Schaeffer Fire was a wildfire in the Kern River Ranger District of the Sequoia National Forest in Tulare County, California in the United States. It was caused by a lightning strike on June 24, 2017. The fire crept through the old burn area of the 2002 McNally Fire for several days before growing to over 580 acres on June 28.

Events
Reported, Saturday, June 24, at approximately 4:16 p.m., the Sacheffer Fire was created by lighting. Burning in the McNally Fire wildfire burn area, it was fueled by brush, timber and tall grass. Two fire personnel worked to put out the fire, which in total burned . 

Smoke from the fire was seen throughout the Lake Isabella area. The fire caused the San Joaquin Valley Air Pollution Control District to alert a smoke advisory in the area. 

The fire was contained at midnight on July 31, 2017. As of August 10, the repair work had begun.

See also
2017 California wildfires

References

2017 California wildfires
Wildfires in Tulare County, California
June 2017 events in the United States
July 2017 events in the United States